The M36 is a short metropolitan route in Greater Johannesburg, South Africa. The entire route is within the city of Krugersdorp in the Mogale City Local Municipality.

Route 
The M36 begins in the suburb of Krugersdorp West, at a junction with the R24 road (Rustenburg Road). It begins by going eastwards as Rustenburg Road, then as Commissioner Street, to pass through the Krugersdorp CBD, where it meets the southern terminus of the R563 Road (Hekpoort Road). It becomes Coronation Street and forms a junction with the R28 road (Paardekraal Drive) adjacent to the Coronation Park. Just after, it meets the R24 again and joins it east-south-east for 1.9 kilometres as Main Reef Road, before the M36 becomes its own road eastwards (Barratt Road). After 1.7 kilometres, it reaches its end at a junction with the M18 road (Voortrekker Road) in the suburb of Factoria.

References 

Streets and roads of Johannesburg
Metropolitan routes in Johannesburg